Gérard James is an American set decorator.

Gerard James may also refer to:

 Gerard Luz James (born 1953), United States Virgin Islander politician, funeral director and businessman
 Gerard James of the James baronets

See also
 Gerard James Butler (born 1969), Scottish actor, producer, and singer
 James Gerard (disambiguation)
 Jerry James (disambiguation)